France competed at the 1988 Summer Paralympics in Seoul, South Korea. 116 competitors from France won 140 medals including 46 gold, 44 silver and 50 bronze and finished 5th in the medal table.

Medalists

Gold medalists

Silver medalists

Bronze medalists

Demonstration sports
Wheelchair tennis debuted in the 1988 Summer Paralympics. Laurent Giammartini won the gold medal in the men's singles. He went on to win a bronze medal in the 1992 Summer Paralympics.

See also 
 France at the Paralympics
 France at the 1988 Summer Olympics

References 

France at the Paralympics
1988 in French sport
Nations at the 1988 Summer Paralympics